R.A.V. v. City of St. Paul, 505 U.S. 377 (1992), is a case of the United States Supreme Court that unanimously struck down St. Paul's Bias-Motivated Crime Ordinance and reversed the conviction of a teenager, referred to in court documents only as R.A.V., for burning a cross on the lawn of an African-American family since the ordinance was held to violate the First Amendment's protection of freedom of speech.

Facts and procedural background

In the early morning hours of June 21, 1990, the petitioner and several other teenagers allegedly assembled a crudely made cross by taping together broken chair legs. The cross was erected and burned in the front yard of an African American family that lived across the street from the house where the petitioner was staying.  Petitioner, who was a juvenile at the time, was charged with two counts, one of which a violation of the St. Paul Bias-Motivated Crime Ordinance.  The Ordinance provided;

Petitioner moved to dismiss the count under the Bias-Motivated Crime Ordinance on the ground that it was substantially overbroad and impermissibly content based, and therefore facially invalid under the First Amendment.  The trial court granted the motion, but the Minnesota Supreme Court reversed, rejecting petitioner's overbreadth claim because, as the Minnesota Court had construed the Ordinance in prior cases, the phrase "arouses anger, alarm or resentment in others" limited the reach of the ordinance to conduct that amounted to fighting words under the Chaplinsky v. New Hampshire decision.  The Minnesota Court also concluded that the ordinance was not impermissibly content based, because "the ordinance is a narrowly tailored means towards accomplishing the compelling governmental interest in protecting the community against bias-motivated threats to public safety and order."  Petitioner appealed, and the United States Supreme Court granted certiorari.

Decision

Justice Antonin Scalia delivered the opinion of the court, in which Chief Justice William Rehnquist, Justice Anthony Kennedy, Justice David Souter, and Justice Clarence Thomas joined. Justice Byron White wrote an opinion concurring in the judgment, which Justice Harry Blackmun and Justice Sandra Day O'Connor joined in full, and Justice John Paul Stevens joined in part. Justice Blackmun wrote an opinion concurring in the judgment. Justice Stevens wrote an opinion concurring in the judgment, which was joined in part by Justice White and Justice Blackmun.

The majority decision
The Court began with a recitation of the relevant factual and procedural background, noting several times that the conduct at issue could have been prosecuted under different Minnesota statutes. In construing the ordinance, the Court recognized that it was bound by the construction given by the Minnesota Supreme Court.  Therefore, the Court accepted the Minnesota court's conclusion that the ordinance reached only those expressions that constitute "fighting words" within the meaning of Chaplinsky.

Petitioner argued that the Chaplinsky formulation should be narrowed, such that the ordinance would be invalidated as "substantially overbroad," but the Court declined to consider this argument, concluding that even if all of the expression reached by the ordinance was proscribable as "fighting words," the ordinance was facially unconstitutional in that it prohibited otherwise permitted speech solely on the basis of the subjects the speech addressed.

The Court began its substantive analysis with a review of the principles of free speech clause jurisprudence, beginning with the general rule that the First Amendment prevents the government from proscribing speech, or even expressive conduct, because of disapproval of the ideas expressed. The Court noted that while content-based regulations are presumptively invalid, society has permitted restrictions upon the content of speech in a few limited areas, which are "of such slight social value as a step to truth that any benefit that may be derived from them is clearly outweighed by the social interest in order and morality."

The Court then clarified language from previous free speech clause cases, including Roth v. United States, Beauharnais v. Illinois, and Chaplinsky that suggested that certain categories of expression are "not within the area of constitutionally protected speech," and "must be taken in context." The Court's clarification stated that this meant that certain areas of speech "can, consistently with the First Amendment, be regulated because of their constitutionally proscribable content  (obscenity, defamation, etc.)—not that they are categories of speech entirely invisible to the Constitution, so that they may be made the vehicles for content discrimination." Thus, as one of the first of a number of illustrations that Justice Scalia would use throughout the opinion, the government may "proscribe libel, but it may not make the further content discrimination of proscribing only libel critical of the government."

The Court recognized that while a particular utterance of speech can be proscribed on the basis of one feature, the Constitution may prohibit proscribing it on the basis of another feature. Thus, while burning a flag in violation of an ordinance against outdoor fires could be punishable, burning a flag in violation of an ordinance against dishonoring the flag is not. In addition, other reasonable "time, place, or manner" restrictions were upheld, but only if they were "justified without reference to the content of the regulated speech."

The Court recognized two final principles of free speech jurisprudence.  One of these described that when "the entire basis for the content discrimination consists entirely of the very reason the entire class of speech is proscribable, no significant danger of idea or viewpoint discrimination exists." As examples, Justice Scalia wrote,

The other principle of free speech jurisprudence was recognized when the Court wrote that a valid basis for according different treatment to a content-defined subclass of proscribable speech is that the subclass "happens to be associated with particular 'secondary effects' of the speech, so that 'the regulation is justified without reference to the content of the ... speech'"  As an example, the Court wrote that a State could permit all obscene live performances except those involving minors.

Applying these principles to the St. Paul Bias-Motivated Crime Ordinance, the Court concluded that the ordinance was facially unconstitutional. Justice Scalia explained the rationale, writing,

The Court went on to explain that, in addition to being an impermissible restriction based on content, the Ordinance was also viewpoint- based discrimination, writing,

Displays containing some words, such as racial slurs, would be prohibited to proponents of all views, whereas fighting words that "do not themselves invoke race, color, creed, religion, or gender—aspersions upon a person's mother, for example—would seemingly be usable ad libitum in the placards of those arguing in favor of racial, color, etc., tolerance and equality, but could not be used by those speakers' opponents." The Court concluded that "St. Paul has no such authority to license one side of a debate to fight freestyle, while requiring the other to follow Marquess of Queensberry rules."

The Court concluded, "Let there be no mistake about our belief that burning a cross in someone's front yard is reprehensible. But St. Paul has sufficient means at its disposal to prevent such behavior without adding the First Amendment to the fire."

Limitation

In Virginia v. Black (2003), the United States Supreme Court deemed constitutional part of a Virginia statute outlawing the public burning of a cross if done with an intent to intimidate, noting that such expression "has a long and pernicious history as a signal of impending violence."

See also
 List of United States Supreme Court cases, volume 505
 List of United States Supreme Court cases
 Lists of United States Supreme Court cases by volume
 List of United States Supreme Court cases by the Rehnquist Court

References

Further reading

External links 

 First Amendment Library entry on R.A.V. v. City of St. Paul

Overbreadth case law
Hate crime
1992 in United States case law
American Civil Liberties Union litigation
United States Supreme Court cases of the Rehnquist Court
African-American history of Minnesota
History of Saint Paul, Minnesota
United States Supreme Court cases